Guzmania altsonii is a plant species in the genus Guzmania. This species is native to Venezuela, Colombia, Peru, the Guianas and Ecuador.

References

altsonii
Flora of South America
Plants described in 1930